The following article presents a summary of the 2005-06 football season in Venezuela.

Torneo Apertura ("Opening" Tournament)

Torneo Clausura ("Closing" Tournament)

"Championship" playoff 
Caracas F.C. and U.A. Maracaibo ended with one championship each at the end of the Apertura and Clausura. Tournament rules establish that a playoff game is required.

Aggregate Table

External links 
 Venezuelan Football Federation 
 RSSSF

 
Seasons in Venezuelan football